Third Lake is a lake that is located northeast of Stratford, New York. Fish species present in the lake are brook trout, and golden shiner. There is access by a trail from County Route 10.

References

Lakes of New York (state)
Lakes of Fulton County, New York